Tsvetanka Pavlova Khristova (sometimes spelled Tsvetanka Hristova, 14 March 1962 – 14 November 2008) was a Bulgarian discus thrower. She won gold at the 1991 World Championships and the 1982 European Championships. She also won two Olympic medals, with bronze at the 1988 Seoul Olympics and silver at the 1992 Barcelona Olympics. Her best throw of 73.22 metres in 1987, ranks her eighth on the world all-time list.

Life
Born in Kazanlak, Stara Zagora she became European champion in 1982 at only 20 years of age. Nine years later she won the World Championships, and the following year won an Olympic silver medal. Khristova tested positive for steroids in 1993 and was banned from competition. In 2004, at the age of 42, she competed at the 2004 Summer Olympics.

Her personal best was 73.22 m. That is still the Bulgarian record.

She died on 14 November 2008, of cancer.

International Competitions

References

External links

Standartnews.com listing of Khristova's death - accessed November 15, 2008.
Wallechinsky, David and Jaime Loucky (2008). "Track & Field (Women): Discus Throw". In The Complete Book of the Olympics: 2008 Edition. London: Aurum Press Limited. p. 359.

1962 births
2008 deaths
Athletes (track and field) at the 1988 Summer Olympics
Athletes (track and field) at the 1992 Summer Olympics
Athletes (track and field) at the 2004 Summer Olympics
Bulgarian sportspeople in doping cases
Bulgarian female discus throwers
Doping cases in athletics
Olympic athletes of Bulgaria
Olympic bronze medalists for Bulgaria
Olympic silver medalists for Bulgaria
Deaths from cancer in Bulgaria
World Athletics Championships medalists
European Athletics Championships medalists
People from Kazanlak
Medalists at the 1988 Summer Olympics
Medalists at the 1992 Summer Olympics
Olympic silver medalists in athletics (track and field)
Olympic bronze medalists in athletics (track and field)
Universiade medalists in athletics (track and field)
Goodwill Games medalists in athletics
Universiade gold medalists for Bulgaria
Universiade silver medalists for Bulgaria
World Athletics Championships winners
Medalists at the 1985 Summer Universiade
Medalists at the 1987 Summer Universiade
Competitors at the 1986 Goodwill Games